Anthony Richard Carbines (born 15 June 1973) is an Australian politician, who represents the electoral district of Ivanhoe in the Victorian Legislative Assembly. He has been the Minister for Police, Minister for Crime Prevention and Minister for Racing since June 2022. Previously, he was the Minister for Disability, Ageing and Carers and the Minister for Child Protection and Family Services since December 2021. He is a member of the Labor Party.

Carbines studied journalism at RMIT University and then spent five years as a journalist at the Geelong Advertiser newspaper.

Prior to his election, Carbines was chief-of-staff to Labor MP and Minister for Education Bronwyn Pike, whilst also serving as a councillor on the City of Banyule council. In 2009, he initially lost pre-selection for the seat of Ivanhoe, however this decision was subsequently overturned when the then-premier, John Brumby, personally intervened to pre-select Carbines instead of the sitting MP, Craig Langdon. Langdon subsequently resigned from the parliament with the election a few weeks away. Due to the cost and difficulty involved in holding a by-election, none was called and the seat remained vacant until Carbines was elected.

His stepmother is Elaine Carbines, who was a member of the Victorian Legislative Council.

References

External links
 Parliamentary voting record of Anthony Carbines at Victorian Parliament Tracker

1973 births
Living people
Australian Labor Party members of the Parliament of Victoria
RMIT University alumni
Members of the Victorian Legislative Assembly
Victoria (Australia) local councillors
21st-century Australian politicians
People from Preston, Victoria
Journalists from Melbourne
Politicians from Melbourne